Celina is a feminine given name derived from the Roman name Cecilia, referring to a woman from the Caecilia gens. Alternately, it is considered a form of the name Marceline, a French feminine form of the name Marcel. The French version of the name is Céline. The name has also been considered a variation of the name Selene, the Greek goddess and personification of the Moon, and its variants Selena and Selina.

People
Celina González (1929–2015), Cuban singer and songwriter
Celina Hinchcliffe (born 1976), English television sports broadcaster
Celina Jade (born 1985), actress
Celina Jaitly (born 1981), Indian actress
Celina Jesionowska (born 1933), Polish sprinter
Celina Kanunnikava, Polish-Belarusian artist
Celina Midelfart (born 1973), Norwegian businesswoman
Celina Ree (born 1990), Danish pop rock singer and songwriter
Celina Seghi (born 1920), Italian former alpine skier

Notes